James Sidney Rollins (April 19, 1812 – January 9, 1888) was a nineteenth-century Missouri politician and lawyer.  He helped establish the University of Missouri, led the successful effort to get it located in Boone County, and gained funding for the university with the passage of a series of acts in the Missouri Legislature.  For his efforts, he was named "Father of the University of Missouri."

As a border state Congressman, Rollins played a role in Congress's passage of the Thirteenth Amendment abolishing slavery. He changed his vote to support the amendment, and spoke in favor of it. Rollins was a Whig for the first 20 years of his political career. When that party broke up, he began a political transition, changing parties several times before becoming a Republican late in his life. Rollins' lifelong support of business development was compatible with Republican policies, but his situation as a major slaveowner prevented him from joining the Republican Party until well after the Civil War.

Early years and family

Rollins was born in Richmond, in Madison County, Kentucky.  His father, Anthony Wayne Rollins, a physician, was born in Pennsylvania of Scotch-Irish immigrant parents, and named for the Revolutionary War hero Anthony Wayne.  His mother, Sarah Harris Rodes Rollins, was born in Virginia and was of English descent.

Rollins studied at Richmond Academy, attended Washington College (now Washington and Jefferson College) in Pennsylvania, and graduated from Indiana University in 1830.  The Rollins family moved from Kentucky to Boone County, Missouri that same year.  Rollins read law in the Columbia office of Abiel Leonard for two years, while helping to manage his father's farm.  In 1832, Rollins enlisted in the Black Hawk War, and was given the rank of Major.  After the war, Rollins entered law school at Transylvania University in Lexington, Kentucky.  When he graduated in 1834, he was admitted to the bar, and began practicing in Columbia that same year.

In 1837, Rollins married Mary Elizabeth Hickman (1820–1907).  She was the daughter of James Hickman, and was from Franklin, in nearby Howard County, Missouri.  They had 11 children, seven of whom survived to adulthood.

Early political career
Rollins began his political career as a Whig.  His politics reflected his interest in business and resource development.  In 1836, he purchased a Whig newspaper, the Columbia Patriot, which he edited for several years.  That same year, he attended a railroad convention in St. Louis, where he was chosen to petition Congress for Missouri railroad land grants.

Missouri legislator
Rollins was elected to the Missouri Legislature in 1838, representing Boone County.  He was elected Representative in 1838, 1840, and 1854, and as a Senator in 1846.  He was a delegate to the 1844 Whig National Convention.  He ran for Governor of Missouri in 1848 and again in 1857, but was defeated both times.  Rollins was a Whig from 1836 to 1855, when the party dissolved in dissension over the Kansas-Nebraska Act regarding the extension of slavery into territories and new states. As a large slaveholder in Missouri, Rollins was not an abolitionist, but he opposed both the extension of slavery and secession.
	
When the Whig Party ended, Rollins began a political transition.  He ran as an independent in his second try for governor, supported by Know-Nothings, Thomas Hart Benton Democrats, and remnants of the Whigs.  He lost to Democrat Robert M. Stewart by 334 votes.  When he was not in the Missouri Legislature, Rollins developed his law practice in Columbia, despite ambivalence about the monotony of a legal career.

Establishment of the University of Missouri
The first bill that Rollins drafted as a State Representative was to locate the University of Missouri.  The bill directed that the university be located in one of six counties in the central part of the state along the Missouri River:  Boone, Callaway, Cole, Cooper, Howard, and Saline Counties.  Cole and Howard County legislators had hoped to secure the university for their counties by direct legislation, but Rollins' bill passed on February 8, 1839.  Three days later, the Geyer Act, introduced by Henry Geyer of St. Louis, passed, officially incorporating the University of Missouri.

Rollins' act directed that the county that raised the most money would be awarded the university.  Rollins himself made a significant donation, and put considerable effort into raising subscriptions from fellow Boone County residents.  The competition was most intense among Boone, Callaway, and Howard Counties.  When state commissioners visited Howard County, Rollins was there.  After learning that Howard County had increased the appraised value of land donated in the competition, Rollins sold  of his own land to Boone County for $25 an acre.  Boone County in turn appraised the land at $75 an acre in its bid.  The $117,921 raised by Boone County was the highest amount, and won the university.

Rollins' efforts to support the University of Missouri met with limited success before the Civil War.  As Senator, he drafted a report in 1847 which proposed state funding for the school and a professorship for advanced studies in "Theory and Practice of Teaching."  The Senate passed a version two years later, providing no funding and only a "Normal Professorship."

U.S. Representative and the Thirteenth Amendment
Rollins was elected to Congress in 1860 as a Constitutional Unionist.  He defeated Independent Democrat John B. Henderson.  Rollins was elected again in 1862, this time as a Unionist, defeating Radical Republican Arnold Krekel.

During the Civil War, Rollins remained a Unionist, and voted for most war measures in Congress.  But his stands on slavery and African-American rights were more conservative than those of the dominant Republican Party.  He opposed a measure allowing blacks and Indians to enlist in the war, on the basis that this policy would offend Southerners.  He also stated that the Emancipation Proclamation was legally void, and only defensible as a military necessity.

In Congress, Rollins introduced a bill to build a transcontinental railroad, passed as the Pacific Railway Acts of 1862.  He also advocated the Morrill Act of 1862, providing funding for state agricultural colleges.

Rollins' support of the Thirteenth Amendment to the Constitution, which abolished slavery, played a key part in its passage by Congress, sending the amendment to the states for ratification.  The Senate passed the bill easily on its first vote on April 8, 1864, but the House defeated it twice in 1864 before passing it on January 31, 1865.  Rollins initially voted against the bill.  Shortly before the third vote, President Lincoln personally asked Rollins to support the amendment, as necessary to preserve the Union.  Rollins agreed to do so.  On January 13, 1865, two days after the Missouri Constitutional Convention abolished slavery there, he spoke for the first time for the amendment, in a lengthy and persuasive speech to Congress.  With Rollins' support, the amendment passed with the required two-thirds majority with just two votes to spare.

Rollins witnessed the Centralia Massacre in 1864.

Later political career
Rollins did not run for Congress in 1864, but returned to Columbia.  In that year's presidential election, he endorsed the Democratic Party candidate, George B. McClellan.  This signaled his preference for the party's conservative stance on slavery and African-American equality, and recognized its shift from secessionism.  In 1866, he was elected as a Democrat to the Missouri House of Representatives, and in 1868 to the State Senate.  There, Rollins supported President Johnson's mild Reconstruction policies, but did not strongly denounce Radical Republican efforts to develop more stringent policies, so as not to harm funding prospects for the University of Missouri.

Rollins' support of business aligned with Republican policies, but his opposition to racial equality kept him from joining that party until after Reconstruction and Republicans stopped pushing for this.  Now out of office, he broke with the Democrats in 1878 over their support of paper currency.  He became a Republican, and remained one for the rest of his life.

While a legislator, Rollins focused on the University of Missouri.  The state was not funding the school.  The Civil War left the university in poor physical shape and with few students.  The local fundraising in the original competition set a precedent for the State Legislature to ignore later requests for money.  As a result, the campus was small, the students came mainly from Boone County, and the place seemed more like a county school than a state university.

As a legislator after the war, Rollins wrote, introduced, and helped pass several measures, which together financially stabilized the University of Missouri for the first time, and strengthened Columbia's hold on it:
 Appropriation of $10,000 for a new President's House, and $16,000 per year for general funding (1867).
 Establishment of Normal Department to train school teachers (1867).
 Establishment of Agricultural and Mechanical College.  Concessions to get the bill passed required Boone County to contribute money for the new college, and located the new Missouri School of Mines in Rolla, not in Columbia (1870).
 Investment of $122,000 from state sales of "seminary lands" for higher education, as authorized by the Federal Government (1870).  This money was augmented with a similar act in 1883.
 Issue of $166,000 in bonds to build the new School of Mines at Rolla (called Missouri University of Science and Technology as of 2008), liquidate University debt, complete the Science Building (called Switzler Hall as of 2008), and add to the university's permanent endowment (1872).
 Setting maximum university tuition at 10 dollars, making college easily affordable for most students (1872).

Father of the University of Missouri
When Rollins returned to Columbia after the 1872 legislative session, students assembled and adopted resolutions thanking him for his work on the university's behalf.  The faculty issued a similar statement.  The Board of Curators passed resolutions on May 9, 1872, giving Rollins the honorary title of "Pater Universitatis Missouriensis" ("Father of the University of Missouri").

University of Missouri Board of Curators President
Rollins was first named to the University of Missouri Board of Curators, the university's governing body, in 1847.  He held the position until 1848, when the State Legislature removed the entire Board.  He again joined the board in 1869, and was elected its President that same year.  He held the position until ill health forced his resignation in 1886.

Friendship with George Caleb Bingham
Among his many acquaintances, Rollins had a lifelong friendship with artist and politician George Caleb Bingham.  Bingham painted numerous portraits of Rollins family members, including several of Rollins himself.  Rollins gave Bingham a boost early in his career by getting several people in Columbia to have him paint their portraits.  He later helped Bingham get a commission to do portraits of Thomas Jefferson and George Washington for the Missouri State Capitol, and he helped finance printings of Bingham's General Order No. 11.  Late in Bingham's life, Rollins helped him get a position as the University of Missouri's first art professor.
	
Rollins and Bingham named sons after each other.  Bingham frequently visited the Rollins home, sometimes staying for a month at a time.  The two maintained a frequent correspondence for over forty-five years, until Bingham's death, in which they discussed a variety of personal, social, and political issues.

Death

In 1874, Rollins was injured in a train wreck while traveling to St. Louis.  He was bedridden for several months, and although he recovered to live 14 more years, he never fully regained his strength.  Rollins died on January 9, 1888, in Columbia, Missouri.  He is buried there at Columbia Cemetery.

Notes

References
 Christ-Janer, Albert, George Caleb Bingham of Missouri, The Story of an Artist (1940).  Dodd Mead and Company.
 Mering, John V., "The Political Transition of James S. Rollins," in Missouri Historical Review Vol. LIII, No. 3 (April, 1959), pp. 217–226.
 Nagel, Paul C., George Caleb Bingham, Missouri's Famed Painter and Forgotten Politician (2005).  University of Missouri Press.
 Smith, William Benjamin, James Sidney Rollins Memoir (1891).  De Vinne Press.
 Stephens, Frank F., A History of the University of Missouri (1962).  University of Missouri Press.
 Viles, Jonas, The University of Missouri, A Centennial History (1939).  University of Missouri Press.
 Vorenberg, Michael, Final Freedom:  The Civil War, the Abolition of Slavery, and the Thirteenth Amendment (2001).  Cambridge University Press.  .

Further reading
 Rollins, Curtis B., comp., "Letters of George Caleb Bingham to James S. Rollins," in Missouri Historical Review Vols. XXXII, Nos. 1-4 and XXXIII, Nos. 1-4 (eight part series, October 1937-July 1939).
 Wood, James M., James Sidney Rollins of Missouri; A Political Biography (1951).  Thesis (Ph.D.), Stanford University.

External links
 Retrieved on 2009-04-28
James S. Rollins (1812-1888), Papers at The State Historical Society of Missouri.   Online index includes biographical sketch and discussion of his correspondence.
James S. Rollins and George Caleb Bingham: A Mizzou Friendship

1812 births
1888 deaths
People from Richmond, Kentucky
Missouri Whigs
Missouri Constitutional Unionists
Constitutional Union Party members of the United States House of Representatives
Members of the United States House of Representatives from Missouri
Unionist Party members of the United States House of Representatives from Missouri
Missouri Democrats
Missouri Republicans
Missouri Unionists
Members of the Missouri House of Representatives
Missouri state senators
Missouri lawyers
United States Army officers
People of Missouri in the American Civil War
Politicians from Columbia, Missouri
Lawyers from Columbia, Missouri
Washington & Jefferson College alumni
Indiana University alumni
Transylvania University alumni
University of Missouri people
University of Missouri curators
Burials at Columbia Cemetery (Columbia, Missouri)
19th-century American politicians
American lawyers admitted to the practice of law by reading law
19th-century American lawyers